Asteroid laser ablation is a proposed method for deflecting asteroids, involving the use of a laser array to alter the orbit of an asteroid. Laser ablation works by heating up a substance enough to allow gaseous material to eject, either through sublimation (solid to gas) or vaporization (liquid to gas). The ejecting material creates a thrust, which over an extended period of time can change the trajectory of the asteroid. As a proof of concept on a small scale, Travis Brashears, a researcher at UC Santa Barbara's Experimental Cosmology Lab, led by Dr. Philip Lubin, has already experimentally verified that laser ablation can de-spin and spin-up an asteroid. Further testing and development of this method are being done by groups at UC Santa Barbara, NASA and the  University of Strathclyde.

Necessity for asteroid deflection  
Modern humans, or Homo sapiens, have existed for approximately 200,000 years. By comparison, the dinosaurs survived on Earth for over 100 million years before the  Chixculub asteroid wiped them out. Asteroids could still potentially pose a serious threat to every major city on earth and even to our whole species.

Chelyabinsk meteor 
February, 2013, the Chelyabinsk Meteor exploded at a height of 30 kilometers over western Russia. The explosion was between 20 and 30 times stronger than the bomb dropped on Hiroshima; the resulting shock wave broke windows on the ground and injured around 1,500 people. Due to the meteor's relatively shallow angle it exploded high in Earth atmosphere. However, had the meteor reached Earth's surface or exploded lower in the atmosphere the results could have been catastrophic.

Detection 
Despite NASA's efforts to detect Near Earth Objects (NEO's), the Chelyabinsk Meteor went undetected. In recent years, NASA, in partnership with the European Space Agency, have been increasing their efforts to track all NEO's with the potential to cross Earth's orbit. On their website, NASA has a public list of all known NEO's which present a potential impact risk. However, the list remains incomplete and the question of what to do in the event of an imminent impact remains unanswered.

Politics of deflection 

Laser ablation is a promising method because it allows an asteroid to be redirected without breaking the asteroid into smaller pieces, each of which may pose its own threat to Earth. The nuclear impactor is another proposed method for deflecting asteroids, but is less promising than laser ablation for both political and technical reasons:  
 Blowing up an asteroid could create multiple smaller asteroid fragments, which could each be as destructive as the larger asteroid.  
 Detonating an atomic bomb high up in Earth's atmosphere could produce unforeseen repercussions.   
 The Outer Space Treaty is a cold war treaty signed in 1967 which prohibits weapons of mass destruction from being placed in space. It effectively blocks any research group from experimentally verifying the nuclear impactor method.   
Laser ablation is already being experimentally tested in labs as a method for asteroid deflection and there are plans to begin testing on the International Space Station (ISS), and in low Earth orbit.

Asteroid impact avoidance 

Short acting laser ablation is used, to verify and explore, the effectiveness of the powerful thermal X-ray pulse that would be emitted upon the detonation of an asteroid stand-off nuclear explosive device. Investigations to this end were conducted in 2015 by exposing common meteorite fragments to tuned laser pulses, provided by Sandia National Laboratory.

In operation 
 A laser array is focused on the target asteroid.
 The laser heats the surface of the asteroid to extremely high temperatures: . 
 Material on the surface of the asteroid is ablated and ejected away from the asteroid. 
 Newton's third law states that for any action there is an equal and opposite reaction. As the material becomes a gas it is pushed away from the asteroid and by Newton's third law, it also pushes back on the asteroid with an equal force, called a thrust. 
 Newton's second law states that force is equal to mass times acceleration, or F=ma. Although the thrust on the asteroid is tiny in comparison to the asteroid's mass, by Newton's second law there will still be some small acceleration. 
 Over time the small acceleration on the asteroid significantly alters its trajectory. Once the asteroid is no longer on course to collide with Earth the laser can be removed.
 Deflecting an asteroid using laser ablation will likely take between 1 and 10 years, depending on a number of factors.

Proposed systems 
There are two types of proposed asteroid laser ablation systems, a stand-on system and a stand-off system. The main difference is the size and position of the laser array used.

Stand-on system 
A stand-on system consists of one or more spacecraft equipped with a laser array which are sent to the target asteroid. The spacecraft would fly in formation with the asteroid till the required deflection is achieved. The number and size of the spacecraft depend on the size of the asteroids and on the time between the start of the deflection action and the predicted time of impact with the Earth. Stand-on systems require the launch of relatively small spacecraft, compatible with current launch capabilities, can be tailored to specific deflection missions and do to require the construction and maintenance of large infrastructures in space. Fractionated systems with multiple spacecraft were proposed by Vasile and Maddock and the sensitivity of their effectiveness was studied by Zuiani and Vasile. Stand on systems were shown to be more mass effective (less mass launched into space for the same deflection) than other slow push solutions like gravity tractor or ion beaming. One of the major technical challenges of stand on systems is the contamination due to the plume of gas and debris resulting form the ablation process. In 2013, following a study supported by the European Space Agency, the Light-Touch 2 mission concept was proposed as a practical demonstration to manipulate small asteroids.

Stand-off system 
A stand-off system is a large laser array which would orbit the Earth or possibly the moon. It would range from approximately the size of the ISS to around 10 times larger. The system would be able to deflect even the largest asteroids, which can be hundreds of kilometers across, and also ideally be able to target multiple asteroids at once if necessary. Although this system would be the most effective against a wide variety of threats, its size, and consequentially its cost, make it an unrealistic option for the near future. The implementation of this type of system would likely require the cooperation and collaboration of multiple governments and agencies.

Important factors 
There are many factors which contribute to the effectiveness of an asteroid laser ablation system. Researchers have been looking at the strength of the laser, the shape and composition of the target asteroid, as well as the orbit geometry.

Laser strength 
A stronger laser can create a greater thrust on an asteroid. Researchers at UC Santa Barbara have experimentally simulated the time it would take to redirect a moderately sized asteroid using different strength lasers. The strongest lasers tested could hypothetically require under a year to redirect an asteroid a safe distance from the Earth, while the weakest lasers could take up to 10 years.  
 The advantage of a weak laser is that requires less energy to power and, as a result, costs less than a higher powered laser.
 The benefit of a strong laser is that it doesn't depend upon our ability to predict impacts years in advance. Asteroids are difficult to track and impacts are even more difficult to predict; a strong laser ensures greater protection. 
Choosing the optimal laser strength is a question of balancing the cost, energy use, and desired level of protection.

Power source
Typically such systems require substantial amounts of power. For space-based systems, this might require either some form of nuclear power, or power from a Space-Based Solar Power satellite. Many proponents of Space-Based Solar Power imagine one of the benefits of such an infrastructure includes the ability to divert asteroids and comets are alter their trajectory for exploitation via asteroid mining, as well as for laser-sail based interstellar propulsion.

Asteroid composition 
Asteroids vary greatly in their composition and shape. An asteroid's composition can range from entirely metallic, to entirely rocky, to a mix of rock and metals. The composition must be taken into account since each material behaves differently when ablated. Initial trials at the University of Strathclyde have shown that laser ablation could be more effective on dense metallic asteroids, because of the shape made by the ejecting material.

Asteroid shape 
Initial work on asteroid deflection via laser ablation assumed the asteroid to be spherical; more recent work considered rotating or tumbling ellipsoidal models and investigated the simultaneous control of the orbit and rotation of the asteroid. However, asteroids have more complex shapes and a very irregular surface, thus some research addressed the use of laser ablation using realistic models of known asteroids.

References 

Asteroids
Planetary defense
Prevention